SKY Pacific is a Fiji based pay TV service formerly owned by Fiji Television Limited delivering encrypted signals of 26 channels via direct-to-home (DTH) satellite on C-band to subscribers in Fiji and across the South Pacific. It is headquartered in the capital city of Fiji, Suva City with branch offices in Suva, Lautoka, Nadi and Labasa. On April 1, 2016, Digicel Fiji officially acquired the company.

History
Established in 2005 by Fiji TV as a Direct-To-Home (DTH) satellite service for Fiji and the Pacific, it started with 12 channels and eventually expanded to 16 channels in 2006.

SKY Pacific currently operates on MPEG-4 platform with its encrypted signals uplinked to Intelsat 19 from its base station in Suva and delivered to households across 13 island countries in the South Pacific including American Samoa, Cook Islands, Fiji, Kiribati (East), Nauru, New Caledonia, Niue, Papua New Guinea, Samoa, Solomon Islands, Tonga and Vanuatu.

However, the territories of French Polynesia (Tahiti), Tokelau, Tuvalu and Kiribati (West) were missed out from reaching after SKY Pacific migrated from Intelsat 18 to IntelSat 19 in June, 2013.

Digicel Buy-out
In September 2015, Digicel Fiji decided to buy out Sky Pacific for a mere FJD$5.75m but the Fiji Government refused the buy-out due to Digicel not being owned by a local company. In March 2016, Digicel were finally given a 12-year licence to buy and operate Sky Pacific in Fiji provided that Digicel Fiji is barred from placing local advertisements and local content on Sky Pacific. Local content will only be allowed during natural disasters and to remove all the local content from their channels which meant Sky Pacific had to drop 2 channels, The Pacific Channel and Fiji One which Digicel complied with but they were allowed to add one of their own channels in TVWan to the lineup.

Digicel Fiji finally took control of Sky Pacific on April 1, 2016.

Channels available

Prepay service 
 TVWAN

Kids 

 Nickelodeon
 cartoon network

Documentary 

 Discovery Channel
 Love Nature
 History
 Crime & Investigation

Entertainment 

 AXN (Asia)
 WarnerTV
 Lifetime
 Rock entertainment 
 Rialto 
 Paramount 
 Food network

Sports 

 TVWAN sports
 TVWAN sports 2
 ESPN Pacific Rim
 Fight Sports (discontinued) 
 Premier League TV

Indian 

 Colors
 Sony Entertainment Television
 Star Plus
 Zee Cinema
 Zee TV

News 

 CNN International
 BBC World News

Religious 

 DayStar

Overseas affiliates
SKY Pacific has distribution deals with agents in several Pacific island countries:

American Samoa (Samoa Systems Incorporated)
Cook Islands (SKY Cook Islands Ltd.)
Nauru (Central Meridian Ltd)
Niue (Broadcasting Corporation of Niue)
Samoa (Polylink Telecommunications Ltd)
Tonga (Tonga Broadcasting Commission)

Notes

External links
Official site

Television stations in Fiji
Digicel
Mass media companies established in 2005
2005 establishments in Fiji
2016 mergers and acquisitions